John Nettleton (born 5 February 1929) is an English actor best known for playing Sir Arnold Robinson, Cabinet Secretary in Yes Minister (1980–84) and President of the Campaign for Freedom of Information in the follow-up Yes, Prime Minister (1985–88). Another political role for Nettleton was a Conservative Party Member of Parliament (Sir Stephen Baxter) in the sitcom The New Statesman.

Other television roles included a Ministry of Defence department chief in The Avengers (episode "The See-Through Man", 1967), a police sergeant in Please Sir! (1969), Alfred Booker in The Champions (episode "Full Circle", 1969), Froggett in the office comedy series If It Moves File It (1970), Francis Bacon in Elizabeth R (1971), a Detective Superintendent in Doctor at Large in 1971, George Pattinson in a now lost episode ("The Uninvited") of Out of the Unknown (also in 1971), as Arthur Bellamy, brother to Viscount Bellamy, in Upstairs, Downstairs (1972), The Country Wife (1977), Brideshead Revisited (1981), The Flame Trees of Thika (1981), The Citadel (1983), Martin Luther, Heretic (1983), Brass (1983), East of Ipswich (1987), Reverend Ernest Matthews in the Doctor Who serial Ghost Light (1989), Longitude (2000),  Midsomer Murders (2005) and Kingdom (2008). In the 1960s and 1970s, Nettleton was the reader of various illustrated stories on children's television programme Blue Peter. Often these were about historical figures, such as Florence Nightingale.

On stage, Nettleton has appeared in the Lyttelton Theatre of the Royal National Theatre in the 2006 productions of Harley Granville-Barker's The Voysey Inheritance, directed by Peter Gill. He also appeared in the Olivier Theatre in the 1990 production of Alan Bennett's Wind in the Willows, directed by Nicholas Hytner. He also voices Grandpa in the PC game The Scruffs.

Nettleton was born in Lewisham, London, England. He is married to actress Deirdre Doone.

Filmography

References

External links

1929 births
Living people
20th-century English male actors
English male film actors
English male stage actors
English male television actors
Male actors from London
21st-century English male actors
People from Lewisham